The  Alaska Aces season was the 35th season of the franchise in the Philippine Basketball Association (PBA). It was also the team's final season in the league, as they announced on February 16, 2022, that they would leave the league after the 2021 Governor's Cup.

Key dates
March 14: The PBA Season 46 draft was held at the TV5 Media Center in Mandaluyong.

Draft picks

Roster

  also served as Alaska's board governor.

Philippine Cup

Eliminations

Standings

Game log

|-bgcolor=ccffcc
| 1
| July 16
| Blackwater
| W 103–77
| Michael DiGregorio (20)
| Rodney Brondial (10)
| JVee Casio (7)
| Ynares Sports Arena
| 1–0
|-bgcolor=ffcccc
| 2
| July 21
| Magnolia
| L 82–84
| Yousef Taha (20)
| Jeron Teng (12)
| Ahanmisi, DiGregorio, Teng (3)
| Ynares Sports Arena
| 1–1
|-bgcolor=ffcccc
| 3
| July 24
| Phoenix
| L 93–101
| Gab Banal (17)
| Yousef Taha (12)
| Michael DiGregorio (4)
| Ynares Sports Arena
| 1–2
|-bgcolor=ccffcc
| 4
| July 28
| Rain or Shine
| W 74–48
| Rodney Brondial (13)
| Abu Tratter (13)
| Maverick Ahanmisi (4)
| Ynares Sports Arena
| 2–2
|-bgcolor=ffcccc
| 5
| July 31
| Meralco
| L 80–89
| Gab Banal (20)
| Yousef Taha (9)
| Jeron Teng (5)
| Ynares Sports Arena
| 2–3

|-bgcolor=ffcccc
| 6
| September 2
| NLEX
| L 74–84
| Maverick Ahanmisi (17)
| Rodney Brondial (10)
| Jeron Teng (3)
| DHVSU Gym
| 2–4
|-bgcolor=ccffcc
| 7
| September 17
| Barangay Ginebra
| W 89–75
| Abu Tratter (13)
| Rodney Brondial (10)
| Ahamnisi, Marcelino (3)
| DHVSU Gym
| 3–4
|-bgcolor=ffcccc
| 8
| September 18
| TNT
| L 85–103
| Abu Tratter (12)
| Brondial, Tratter (9)
| Alec Stockton (4)
| DHVSU Gym
| 3–5
|-bgcolor=ffcccc
| 9
| September 19
| Terrafirma
| L 89–105
| Abu Tratter (18)
| Rodney Brondial (14)
| JVee Casio (6)
| DHVSU Gym
| 3–6
|-bgcolor=ffcccc
| 10
| September 22
| San Miguel
| L 100–101
| Abu Tratter (24)
| Rodney Brondial (12)
| JVee Casio (4)
| DHVSU Gym
| 3–7
|-bgcolor=ffcccc
| 11
| September 23
| NorthPort
| L 94–122 
| Jeron Teng (18)
| Brondial, Tratter (8)
| Adamos, Casio (3)
| DHVSU Gym
| 3–8

Governors' Cup

Eliminations

Standings

Game log

|-bgcolor=ccffcc
| 1
| December 8
| NorthPort
| W 87–85
| Olu Ashaolu (20)
| Olu Ashaolu (14)
| Maverick Ahanmisi (5)
| Ynares Sports Arena
| 1–0
|-bgcolor=ccffcc
| 2
| December 10
| San Miguel
| W 99–94
| Olu Ashaolu (23)
| Olu Ashaolu (13)
| Maverick Ahanmisi (6)
| Ynares Sports Arena
| 2–0
|-bgcolor=ffcccc
| 3
| December 12
| Barangay Ginebra
| L 77–80
| Olu Ashaolu (17)
| Olu Ashaolu (18)
| Jeron Teng (4)
| Ynares Sports Arena
| 2–1
|-bgcolor=ffcccc
| 4
| December 17
| TNT
| L 77–81
| Olu Ashaolu (29)
| Olu Ashaolu (18)
| Jeron Teng (4)
| Smart Araneta Coliseum
| 2–2
|-bgcolor=ccffcc
| 5
| December 22
| Blackwater
| W 98–75
| Maverick Ahanmisi (17)
| Abu Tratter (11)
| Robbie Herndon (4)
| Smart Araneta Coliseum
| 3–2

|-bgcolor=ccffcc
| 6
| February 17, 2022
| Rain or Shine
| W 80–74
| Olu Ashaolu (23)
| Olu Ashaolu (17)
| Olu Ashaolu (4)
| Smart Araneta Coliseum
| 4–2
|-bgcolor=ccffcc
| 7
| February 19, 2022
| Terrafirma
| W 102–97
| Jeron Teng (30)
| Olu Ashaolu (19)
| Olu Ashaolu (6)
| Smart Araneta Coliseum
| 5–2
|-bgcolor=ffcccc
| 8
| February 23, 2022
| NLEX
| L 89–106
| Abu Tratter (17)
| Maverick Ahanmisi (12)
| Olu Ashaolu (6)
| Ynares Center
| 5–3
|-bgcolor=ccffcc
| 9
| February 26, 2022
| Meralco
| W 94–93
| Ashaolu, DiGregorio (21)
| Olu Ashaolu (9)
| Maverick Ahanmisi (10)
| Ynares Center
| 6–3

|-bgcolor=ffcccc
| 10
| March 3, 2022
| Phoenix
| L 99–104
| Olu Ashaolu (24)
| Olu Ashaolu (10)
| Olu Ashaolu (6)
| Smart Araneta Coliseum
| 6–4
|-bgcolor=ffcccc
| 11
| March 6, 2022
| Magnolia
| L 91–118
| RK Ilagan (14)
| Olu Ashaolu (10)
| Abu Tratter (5)
| Smart Araneta Coliseum6,502
| 6–5

Playoffs

Bracket

Game log

|-bgcolor=ccffcc
| 1
| March 16, 2022
| NLEX
| W 93–79
| Mark St. Fort (17)
| Mark St. Fort (14)
| Ahanmisi, Ilagan, Teng (3)
| Smart Araneta Coliseum7,091
| 1–0
|-bgcolor=ffcccc
| 2
| March 19, 2022
| NLEX
| L 80–96
| Mark St. Fort (14)
| Mark St. Fort (7)
| Ahanmisi, Ilagan, St. Fort (3)
| Smart Araneta Coliseum10,486
| 1–1

Transactions

Free Agency

Subtraction

Trades

Pre-season

Philippine Cup

Recruited imports

References

Alaska Aces (PBA) seasons
Alaska Aces